Iyenoma Destiny Udogie (born 28 November 2002) is an Italian professional footballer who currently plays as a wingback for Serie A club Udinese, on loan from Tottenham Hotspur.

Club career

Hellas Verona 
Udogie developed in the Hellas Verona youth system, and made his Serie A debut on 8 November 2020, in a 2–2 draw away to Milan.

Udinese 
On 15 July 2021, Udogie joined Udinese on a season-long loan with an obligation to buy. During his debut season, he made 37 appearances for the club, primarily as a left wingback, and scored five goals.

Tottenham Hotspur 
On 16 August 2022, Tottenham Hotspur confirmed that they had signed Udogie on a permanent transfer until 2027, with Udogie returning to Udinese on loan for the season.

Loan to Udinese 
Udogie was immediately loaned back to Udinese for the 2022–23 season.

International career
Born in Italy, Udogie is of Nigerian descent. He is a youth international for Italy.

On 3 September 2021 he made his debut with the Italy U21 squad, playing as a starter in the qualifying match won 3–0 against Luxembourg.

Career statistics

Club

References

External links
Profile at the Tottenham Hotspur F.C. website

2002 births
Living people
Footballers from Verona
Italian footballers
Association football defenders
Italy youth international footballers
Italy under-21 international footballers
Italian people of Nigerian descent
Italian sportspeople of African descent
Serie A players
Hellas Verona F.C. players
Udinese Calcio players